Matthew David Bates (born 10 December 1986) is an English former football manager and former professional footballer, as well as holding a UEFA B coaching licence. He is currently the assistant manager at Northern Premier League side Whitby Town.

Bates played for Hartlepool United, Bradford City, Bristol City, Darlington, Ipswich Town, Norwich City and Middlesbrough.

Club career

Middlesbrough
Born in Stockton-on-Tees, County Durham, Bates began playing at Manchester United's centre of excellence in Birtley since the age of nine. Several years later, the centre was closed down and he was taken in by his hometown club Middlesbrough. After tasting FA Youth Cup success in 2003–04, he was promoted to the first team and made his debut on 6 December 2004, coming on as an injury time replacement for Jimmy Floyd Hasselbaink in a 3–2 win over Manchester City. After a successful loan spell at Darlington, he made a breakthrough, making 28 appearances and played alongside former manager Gareth Southgate in central defence.

Bates had been tipped by some to be Southgate's successor but an injury while on loan at Ipswich in November 2006 prematurely ended his 2006–07 season. He was seriously injured in his second game, tearing his cruciate ligament and partially tearing his medial collateral ligament, and returned to Boro. After recovering in January 2008, Bates moved on loan to Norwich City for two months. He later returned to Middlesbrough after suffering from another knee injury which has resulted in him needing an operation for the third time in just 18 months. He scored his first league goal for Middlesbrough in a crucial 3–1 win over relegation rivals Hull on 11 April 2009.

Following Middlesbrough's relegation from the Premier League in the 2008–09 season, rumours arose regarding his future with them. However, despite a number of Premier League clubs being interested, he opted to stay at Middlesbrough, signing a new three-year deal at the Riverside outfit.

On 25 July, Bates suffered the fourth serious knee injury of his career and could be sidelined for the rest of the year. He went for surgery in September and is confirmed to be out for the entire season.

The 2010/11 season saw Bates as a regular in the Boro line-up. He got his first goal of the season against Portsmouth in a 2–2 draw. Under new Boro manager Tony Mowbray Bates was named new captain. He scored the only goal in a 1–1 draw with Preston North End. His third and final goal of the season came when he returned to the side after injury, playing in midfield, against Sheffield United. He was rewarded with a great start to the 2011/12 season by winning Player of the Month. On 27 March 2012, Bates suffered a fifth serious knee injury which ruled him out for a period of 6 months.

Bristol City
In November 2012, Bates signed for Championship side Bristol City on a short-term deal until January 2013. He made his debut on 17 November in a 1–1 draw away to Blackpool, conceding a penalty in the 90th minute for handball, which Tom Ince converted. On 8 May 2013, Bates was released by City.

Bradford City
On 13 October 2013, Bates signed a 3-month deal with Bradford City. On 15 January 2014, Bates signed a new deal with Bradford City until the end of the season.

Hartlepool United
Bates joined Hartlepool United in June 2014. Bates' playing stint with Hartlepool was ravaged by injuries with the defender making 77 league appearances in four years with the club.

International career
Bates was capped by England at youth level.

Management career
On 24 April 2017, following the dismissal of Dave Jones, Bates was appointed caretaker manager of Hartlepool United for the final two matches of the 2016–17 season. Hartlepool won 2–1 in dramatic fashion on the final day of the season against Doncaster Rovers but this result wasn't enough, as a late Newport County goal saw Hartlepool relegated from the Football League for the first time in their history.

When Craig Harrison was appointed as Hartlepool's first-team manager in May 2017, Bates moved into a coaching role with the club's U21s side.

On 21 February 2018, Bates took charge of Hartlepool again following the dismissal of Craig Harrison. Bates lost his first two games in charge as caretaker manager but managed to turn around the club's poor form and a crucial three-game win streak against Barrow, Bromley and Maidstone United led to him winning the Manager of the Month award for March 2018.

After keeping Hartlepool in the division, Bates was appointed as permanent first-team manager in May 2018.

After six successive league defeats, Bates was sacked as Hartlepool manager in November 2018. 

In September 2022, it was announced that Bates had joined Northern Premier League side Whitby Town as their assistant manager.

Personal life
Matthew has a son with Chanelle Hayes.

Career statistics

Managerial statistics

Honours

As a player
Middlesbrough
FA Youth Cup: 2003–04
UEFA Cup runner-up: 2005–06

As a manager
Individual
National League Manager of the Month: March 2018

References

External links

Matthew Bates profile at the Hartlepool United F.C. website

1986 births
Living people
Footballers from Stockton-on-Tees
Footballers from County Durham
English footballers
England youth international footballers
Association football defenders
Middlesbrough F.C. players
Darlington F.C. players
Ipswich Town F.C. players
Norwich City F.C. players
Bristol City F.C. players
Bradford City A.F.C. players
Hartlepool United F.C. players
Premier League players
English Football League players
English football managers
Hartlepool United F.C. managers
English Football League managers
National League (English football) managers
Hartlepool United F.C. non-playing staff